Pelym is a rural locality (a selo) and the administrative center of Pelymskoye Rural Settlement, Kochyovsky District, Perm Krai, Russia. The population was 720 as of 2010. There are 11 streets.

Geography 
Pelym is located 16 km north of Kochyovo (the district's administrative centre) by road. Kuzmino is the nearest rural locality.

References 

Rural localities in Kochyovsky District